Neonatology is a subspecialty of pediatrics that consists of the medical care of newborn infants, especially the ill or premature newborn. It is a hospital-based specialty, and is usually practised in neonatal intensive care units (NICUs). The principal patients of neonatologists are newborn infants who are ill or require special medical care due to prematurity, low birth weight, intrauterine growth restriction, congenital malformations (birth defects), sepsis, pulmonary hypoplasia or birth asphyxia.

Historical developments
Though high infant mortality rates were recognized by the medical community at least as early as the 1860s, advances in modern neonatal intensive care have led to a significant decline in infant mortality in the modern era. This has been achieved through a combination of technological advances, enhanced understanding of newborn physiology, improved sanitation practices, and development of specialized units for neonatal intensive care. Around the mid-19th century, the care of newborns was in its infancy and was led mainly by obstetricians; however, the early 1900s, pediatricians began to assume a more direct role in caring for neonates. The term neonatology was coined by Dr. Alexander Schaffer in 1960. The American Board of Pediatrics established an official sub-board certification for neonatology in 1975.

In 1835, the Russian physician Georg von Ruehl developed a rudimentary incubator made from two nestled metal tubs enclosing a layer of warm water. By the mid-1850s, these "warming tubs" were in regular use at the Moscow Foundling Hospital for the support of premature infants. 1857, Jean-Louis-Paul Denuce was the first to publish a description of his own similar incubator design, and was the first physician to describe its utility in the support of premature infants in medical literature. By 1931, Dr. A Robert Bauer added more sophisticated upgrades to the incubator which allowed for humidity control and oxygen delivery in addition to heating capabilities, further contributing to improved survival in newborns.

The 1950s brought a rapid escalation in neonatal services with the advent of mechanical ventilation of the newborn, allowing for survival at an increasingly smaller birth weight.

In 1952, the anesthesiologist Dr. Virginia Apgar developed the Apgar score, used for standardized assessment of infants immediately upon delivery, to guide further steps in resuscitation if necessary.

The first dedicated neonatal intensive care unit (NICU) was established at Yale-Newhaven Hospital in Connecticut in 1965. Prior to the development of the NICU, premature and critically ill infants were attended to in nurseries without specialized resuscitation equipment.

In 1968, Dr. Jerold Lucey demonstrated that hyperbilirubinemia of prematurity (a form of neonatal jaundice) could be successfully treated through exposure to artificial blue light. This led to widespread use of phototherapy, which has now become a mainstay of treatment of neonatal jaundice.

In the 1980s, the development of pulmonary surfactant replacement therapy further improved survival of extremely premature infants and decreased chronic lung disease, one of the complications of mechanical ventilation, among less severely premature infants.

Academic training

In the United States, a neonatologist is a physician (MD or DO) practicing neonatology. To become a neonatologist, the physician initially receives training as a pediatrician, then completes an additional training called a fellowship (for 3 years in the US) in neonatology.  In the United States of America most, but not all neonatologists, are board certified in the specialty of Pediatrics by the American Board of Pediatrics or the American Osteopathic Board of Pediatrics and in the sub-specialty of Neonatal-Perinatal Medicine also by the American Board of Pediatrics or American Osteopathic Board of Pediatrics. Most countries now run similar programs for post-graduate training in Neonatology, as a subspecialisation of pediatrics. 

In the United Kingdom, after graduation from medical school and completing the two-year foundation programme, a physician wishing to become a neonatologist would enroll in an eight-year paediatric specialty training programme.  The last two to three years of this would be devoted to training in neonatology as a subspecialty.

Neonatal nursing is subspecialty of nursing that specialize in neonatal care.

Spectrum of care

Rather than focusing on a particular organ system, neonatologists focus on the care of newborns who require hospitalization in the Neonatal Intensive Care Unit (NICU). They may also act as general pediatricians, providing well newborn evaluation and care in the hospital where they are based. Some neonatologists, particularly those in academic settings who perform clinical and basic science research, may follow infants for months or even years after hospital discharge to better assess the long-term outcomes.

The infant is undergoing many adaptations to extrauterine life, and its physiological systems, such as the immune system, are far from fully developed. Diseases of concern during the neonatal period include:
Anemia of prematurity
Apnea of prematurity
Atrial septal defect
Atrioventricular septal defect
Benign neonatal hemangiomatosis
Brachial plexus injury
Bronchopulmonary dysplasia
Cerebral palsy
CHARGE syndrome
Cleft palate
Coarctation of the aorta
Congenital adrenal hyperplasia
Congenital diaphragmatic hernia
Congenital heart disease
Diffuse neonatal hemangiomatosis
DiGeorge syndrome
Encephalocele
Gastroschisis
Hemolytic disease of the newborn
Hirschsprung disease
Hypoplastic left heart syndrome
Hypoxic ischemic encephalopathy
Inborn errors of metabolism
Intraventricular hemorrhage
Lissencephaly
Meconium aspiration syndrome
Necrotizing enterocolitis
Neonatal abstinence syndrome
Neonatal cancer
Neonatal jaundice
Neonatal respiratory distress syndrome
Neonatal lupus erythematosus
Neonatal conjunctivitis
Neonatal pneumonia
Neonatal tetanus
Neonatal sepsis
Neonatal bowel obstruction
Neonatal stroke
Neonatal diabetes mellitus
Neonatal alloimmune thrombocytopenia
Neonatal herpes simplex
Neonatal hemochromatosis
Neonatal meningitis
Neonatal hepatitis
Neonatal hypoglycemia
Neonatal cholestasis
Neonatal seizure
Omphalocele
Patent ductus arteriosus
Perinatal asphyxia
Periventricular leukomalacia
Persistent pulmonary hypertension of the newborn
Persistent truncus arteriosus
Pulmonary hypoplasia
Retinopathy of prematurity
Spina bifida
Spinal muscular atrophy
Supraventricular tachycardia
Tetralogy of Fallot
Total (or partial) anomalous pulmonary venous connection
Tracheoesophageal fistula
Transient tachypnea of the newborn
Transposition of the great vessels
Tricuspid atresia
Trisomy 13/18/21
VACTERL/VATER association
Ventricular septal defect
Vertically transmitted infections

Compensation 

Neonatologists earn significantly more than general pediatricians. In 2018, a typical pediatrician salary in the United States ranged from $221,000 to $264,000, whereas the average salary for a neonatologist was about $299,000 to $355,000.

Hospital costs
Premature birth is one of the most common reasons for hospitalization. The average hospital costs from 2003 to 2011 for the maternal and neonatal surgical services were the lowest hospital costs in the U.S. In 2012, maternal or neonatal hospital stays constituted the largest proportion of hospitalizations among infants, adults aged 18–44, and those covered by Medicaid.

Between 2000 and 2012, the number of neonatal stays (births) in the United States fluctuated around 4.0 million stays, reaching a high of 4.3 million in 2006. Maternal and neonatal stays constituted 27 percent of hospital stays in the United States in 2012. However, the mean hospital costs remained the lowest of the three types of hospital stay (medical, surgical, or maternal and neonatal). The mean hospital cost for a maternal/neonatal stay was $4,300 in 2012 (as opposed to $8,500 for medical stays and $21,200 for surgical stays in 2012).

Encouragingly, an increasing number of programs focused on collaboration of newborn care are now being established all over the world. The International Neonatal Consortium Newborn Care International, Newborn Care International, and the Global Newborn Society  are some notable examples. The goal is to organize and standardize newborn care, and coordinate research efforts.

References

Neonatology